Caryocolum delphinatella is a moth of the family Gelechiidae. It is found in Abruzzi, the south-western Alps (Alpes-Maritimes, Alpes-de-Haute-Provence, Hautes-Alpes, Isère, Walliser Alpen, Alpi Cozie) and the Pyrenees (Haute-Garonne).

The length of the forewings is 7-7.5 mm for males and 6.5–7 mm for females. The forewings are blackish brown mottled with light brown. There are a number of white markings. The hindwings are grey. Adults have been recorded on wing from July to early August.

The larvae probably feed on Minuartia and Silene species.

References

Moths described in 1890
delphinatella
Moths of Europe